Chimaerochloa is a genus of New Guinean plants in the grass family.

The genus name of Chimaerochloa is named after Chimera (mythology) as Linder noted; "the grass takes an the appearance of different genera, depending on which character set is investigated. Thus, it can be regarded as a grass that changes its appearance, a chimaera".

The genus was circumscribed by Hans Peter Linder in Ann. Missouri Bot. Gard. Vol.97 (Issue 3) on page 346 in 2010.

Species
The only known species is Chimaerochloa archboldii.

References

Danthonioideae
Endemic flora of New Guinea
Grasses of Oceania
Monotypic Poaceae genera